The 1997 British Academy Television Awards were held on 29 April at the Royal Albert Hall in London, as a joint ceremony with the British Academy Film Awards and was hosted by Lenny Henry. To date, it is the last occasion upon which the two sets of awards have been given jointly at the same event; from 1998, the Film and Television Awards were given at separate ceremonies for the first time since 1968.

Winners and nominees
Winners are listed first and highlighted in boldface; the nominees are listed below.

{| class=wikitable
|-
!style="background:#BDB76B;" |Best Drama Series
!style="background:#BDB76B;" |Best Drama Serial
|-
|valign="top" |
 EastEnders (BBC / BBC1) Ballykissangel (Ballykea / BBC Northern Ireland / World Productions / BBC1)
 Hamish Macbeth (BBC Scotland / Skyline Films / Zenith Entertainment Ltd / BBC1)
 This Life (World Productions / BBC2)
|valign="top" |
 Our Friends in the North (BBC2) The Crow Road (BBC Scotland / Union Pictures Productions / BBC2)
 The Fragile Heart (Carnival Films / Channel 4)
 Gulliver's Travels (Jim Henson Productions / RHI Entertainment Inc / Channel 4)
|-
|-
!style="background:#BDB76B;" |Best Actor
!style="background:#BDB76B;" |Best Actress
|-
|valign="top" |
 Nigel Hawthorne – The Fragile Heart (Channel 4) Christopher Eccleston – Our Friends in the North (BBC2)
 Albert Finney – Karaoke / Cold Lazarus (BBC1 / Channel 4)
 Peter Vaughan – Our Friends in the North (BBC2)
|valign="top" |
 Gina McKee – Our Friends in the North (BBC2) Alex Kingston – The Fortunes and Misfortunes of Moll Flanders (ITV)
 Helen Mirren – Prime Suspect 5 (ITV)
 Pauline Quirke – The Sculptress (BBC1)
|-
|-
!style="background:#BDB76B;" |Best Comedy (Programme or Series)
!style="background:#BDB76B;" |Best Comedy Performance
|-
|valign="top" |
 Only Fools and Horses (BBC / BBC1) Absolutely Fabulous (BBC / BBC1)
 Father Ted (Hat Trick Productions / Channel 4)
 Game On (Hat Trick Productions / BBC2)
|valign="top" |
 David Jason – Only Fools and Horses (BBC1) Martin Clunes – Men Behaving Badly (BBC1)
 Joanna Lumley – Absolutely Fabulous (BBC1)
 Nicholas Lyndhurst – Only Fools and Horses (BBC1)
|-
|-
!style="background:#BDB76B;" |Best Single Drama
!style="background:#BDB76B;" |Best Factual Series
|-
|valign="top" |
 Hillsborough (Granada Television / ITV) Crossing the Floor (BBC / BBC2)
 The Precious Blood (BBC Northern Ireland / BBC2)
 Some Kind of Life (Granada Television / ITV)
|valign="top" |
 The House (BBC2) Cutting Edge (Channel 4)
 People's Century (BBC / WGBH / BBC2)
 The System (BBC / BBC2)
|-
|-
!style="background:#BDB76B;" |Best Light Entertainment Programme or Series
!style="background:#BDB76B;" |Best Light Entertainment Performance
|-
|valign="top" |
 Shooting Stars (BBC / BBC2) The Fast Show (BBC / BBC2)
 Rory Bremner - Who Else? (Kudos Film & Television / Channel 4)
 Ruby Wax Meets (BBC / BBC1)
|valign="top" |
 John Bird & John Fortune – Rory Bremner - Who Else? / The Long Johns (Channel 4)
 Caroline Aherne – The Mrs Merton Christmas Show (BBC1)
 Rory Bremner – Rory Bremner - Who Else? (Channel 4)
 Paul Merton – Have I Got News for You (BBC2)
|-
|-
!style="background:#BDB76B;" |Best News Coverage
!style="background:#BDB76B;" |Best Talk Show
|-
|valign="top" |
 Newsnight – BSE Coverage (BBC / BBC2) Newsnight – Dunblane Massacre (BBC / BBC2)
 News at Ten — Dunblane Massacre (ITN / ITV)
 Channel 4 News – Refugee Crisis in Zaire and Rwanda (ITN / Channel 4)
|valign="top" |
 The Mrs Merton Christmas Show (Granada Television / BBC1) Esther (BBC / BBC2)
 Late Review (BBC / BBC2)
 Weekly Planet (Wall to Wall Television / Channel 4)
|-
|-
!style="background:#BDB76B;" |Flaherty Award for Best Single Documentary
!style="background:#BDB76B;" |Huw Wheldon Award for Arts Programme or Series
|-
|valign="top" |
 Horizon – Fermat's Last Theorem (BBC / BBC2) Elton John: Tantrums & Tiaras (Rocket Pictures / Carlton Television / ITV)
 Cutting Edge — The Home (Channel 4)
 Timewatch – Remember Aberfan (BBC / BBC2)
|valign="top" |
 Leaving Home (Channel 4) A History of British Art (BBC / BBC2)
 American Visions (BBC / Planet 24 Productions / Time / WNET / BBC2)
 Dancing in the Street: A Rock and Roll History (BBC Bristol / BBC2)
|-
|-
!style="background:#BDB76B;" |Best Sports / Events Coverage in Real Time
!style="background:#BDB76B;" |Best Foreign Programme Award
|-
|valign="top" |
 Euro 96 Coverage (BBC / BBC1) Formula One Grand Prix Racing (BBC / BBC2)
 Monday Night Football (Sky Sports)
 Remembrance Sunday — The Cenotaph (BBC / BBC1)
|valign="top" |
 Murder One|-
|-
!style="background:#BDB76B;" |The Lew Grade Award
!style="background:#BDB76B;" |The Dennis Potter Award
|-
|valign="top" |
 Coronation Street|valign="top" |
 Peter Flannery|-
|-
!style="background:#BDB76B;" |The Alan Clarke Award
!style="background:#BDB76B;" |The Richard Dimbleby Award
|-
|valign="top" |
 Michael Wearing|valign="top" |
 Robert Hughes|-
|-
|}

Craft Awards

Special Awards
 Charles F. Wheeler'''

References

External links
British Academy Craft Awards official website

Television1997
British Academy Television Awards
British Academy Television Awards
British Academy Television Awards
British Academy Television Awards
British Academy Television Awards
Events at the Royal Albert Hall